Major-General Sir Alexander Nelson Rochfort,  (3 June 1850  – 5 December 1916) was a British Army officer who became Lieutenant Governor of Jersey.

Early life
Rochfort was born in County Carlow, Ireland, the fifth son of Horace William Noel Rochfort and Hon. Charlotte Hood, daughter of Samuel Hood, 2nd Baron Bridport.

Military career
Rochfort was commissioned into the Royal Artillery in 1871. He was appointed Aide de camp to the Viceroy of India in 1882 and then Aide de camp to the Chief of Staff of the Expeditionary Force to Suakin in 1885 before taking part in the Second Boer War which broke out in South Africa in October 1899. He was present at the Relief of Kimberley and at the Battle of Paardeberg, was mentioned in despatches (31 March 1900) was severely wounded, and appointed a Companion of the Order of the Bath (CB). During the latter part of the war, he was in command of a column operating in the north-west of Orange River Colony. In despatches dated 23 June 1902, Lord Kitchener, Commander-in-Chief in South Africa, described Rochfort as "fearless of responsibility, never makes difficulties, and has ... all the qualifications for a leader in the field."

He was placed on half-pay from his regiment in October 1902, but soon went back to Africa to be a Special Service Officer in the Somaliland campaign, attached to the Abyssinian army which cooperated with the British Field Force. He returned to become Inspector of the Royal Horse Artillery and Royal Field Artillery in 1904.

He was appointed Lieutenant Governor of Jersey in 1910, serving as such until he retired in October 1916. He was found dead at his chambers in Piccadilly in December 1916.

References

1850 births
1916 deaths
British Army generals
Knights Commander of the Order of the Bath
Companions of the Order of St Michael and St George
Royal Artillery officers
Governors of Jersey
British Army personnel of the Mahdist War
British Army personnel of the Second Boer War